Tieng Tiny (born 9 June 1982) is a former Cambodian footballer who last played as a defender for Preah Khan Reach Svay Rieng. He captained them to promotion from the Cambodian Second League in 2017. Regarded as one of his country's best defenders for the past few years, Tieng Tiny has been a regular for the Cambodia national team since his international debut in 2006. He joined Crown in 2008 after a season with Naga Corp, having previously signed on with Khemara and Phnom Penh Empire.

Honours

Club
Phnom Penh Crown
Cambodian League: 2010,2011
Hun Sen Cup: 2009
2011 AFC President's Cup: Runner up

Nagaworld FC
Cambodian League: 2007
Hun Sen Cup: 2013

References

External links
 

1982 births
Living people
Cambodian footballers
Cambodia international footballers
Cambodian expatriate footballers
People from Siem Reap province
Association football defenders
Angkor Tiger FC players
Nagaworld FC players
Phnom Penh Crown FC players